Yacine Nasreddine Brahimi (born 8 February 1990) is a professional footballer who plays for and captains the Qatari club Al-Gharafa and the Algeria national team. He plays as an attacking midfielder and a winger and is described as "technically gifted" . Yacine is also known for his "Brahimi Moments" (in Portuguese, "Momentos Brahimi").

Brahimi began his career throughout various clubs in the Île-de-France region, having trained at ASB Montreuil and CO Vincennois. In 2003, he was selected to attend the Clairefontaine academy. Brahimi spent three years at the academy and, upon leaving, signed with Rennes. While in the club's youth academy, he achieved several club honours. After turning professional, Brahimi was loaned out to second division club Clermont Foot. While at Clermont, he had a successful individual 2009–10 season. After spending the previous season there on loan, he moved to the La Liga club Granada CF in 2013, and then to Porto for €6.5 million one year later.

An Algerian international, Brahimi is a former France youth international having represented the country at all youth levels. In 2009, he played on the under-19 team that reached the semi-finals at the 2009 UEFA European Under-19 Championship. In February 2013, Brahimi switched his international allegiance to Algeria and made his debut for them a month later, also playing at the 2014 FIFA World Cup and the 2015, 2017, 2019 and 2021 Africa Cup of Nations, winning the 2019 tournament.

Club career

Early career
Brahimi was born in Paris to Algerian parents and grew up in the eastern suburbs of Paris in Montreuil in Seine-Saint-Denis. While growing up, he often emulated Zinedine Zidane while playing street football with friends. Brahimi began his football career playing for his local club ASB Montreuil. After a four-year stint there, he joined CO Vincennois, known for producing Ligue 1 player Blaise Matuidi, in nearby Vincennes. Two years later, Brahimi was selected to attend the renowned Clairefontaine academy in 2003 in order to further his development. While training at Clairefontaine during the week, he regularly played for Vincennois on the weekends. In his final year at Clairefontaine, Brahimi spent a year at the Camp des Loges, the youth training centre of Paris Saint-Germain, training alongside youth international teammate Mamadou Sakho. Despite being courted by several French and European clubs, following his stint at Clairefontaine, he signed an aspirant (youth) contract with Rennes. In October 2010, Brahimi cited choosing Rennes as his destination because of the club's educational value, stating, "In Rennes, the academy gives much importance to the schoolwork", and, "It was a warranty for my parents. They advised me to choose Stade Rennes. That way, I could continue my football training while preparing my Baccalauréat."

Rennes
Brahimi joined Rennes and quickly became a part of a slew of talent in the club's youth academy. He joined Damien Le Tallec (the younger brother of Anthony Le Tallec), Yann M'Vila, Yohann Lasimant, Kévin Théophile-Catherine and Samuel Souprayen as the club's most sought after prospects. The combination of M'Vila, Brahimi, Camara and Le Tallec (all four being members of the class of 1990) were particularly instrumental in their youth team's successes. With the under-16 team, the foursome won the Tournoi Carisport, a national tournament that regularly pits the top academies in France against each other. Two seasons later with the under-18 team, Brahimi won the under-18 league championship for the 2006–07 season. In 2008, the youth academy achieved its biggest honour after winning the Coupe Gambardella. The title was Rennes' third Gambardella Cup and its first since 2003 when the likes of Yoann Gourcuff and Sylvain Marveaux were playing in the competition. Following the 2007–08 season, on 23 June, Brahimi signed his first professional contract agreeing to a three-year deal until June 2011. Though on a professional contract, Brahimi was not assigned a number on the senior team and instead played on the club's Championnat de France amateur team in the fourth division appearing in 22 matches and scoring three goals helping the side finish 1st among professional clubs in their group, thus qualifying for the competition's playoffs, where they lost to Lyon in the semi-finals.

Clermont (loan)
Following a successful international season with France, Rennes decided it would be best to send the young player on loan to receive some much needed playing time. On 3 July 2009, the club announced that Brahimi would join Ligue 2 club Clermont Foot on loan for the entire 2009–10 season. Brahimi arrived at the club following the 2009 UEFA European Under-19 Football Championship, alongside fellow loanee from Juventus Carlo Vecchione, and was assigned the number 28 shirt. He made his professional debut on the opening match day of the season appearing as a substitute in a 2–1 defeat to Arles-Avignon. He scored his first goal for the club on 25 September converting a penalty in the club's 3–2 win over Angers. Brahimi's first goal in open play occurred on 4 December in Clermont's 3–1 win away to Bastia. Two weeks later, he scored again, converting another penalty in a 1–1 draw with Guingamp.

On 23 March 2010, Brahimi scored the opening goal in Clermont's 3–0 win over Ajaccio. Three days later, he scored a goal and provided an assist in a 3–1 away victory over Istres. A month later, Brahimi converted his third penalty of the season in a 3–2 victory over Dijon. The win moved Clermont up to 4th position in the league standings and just three points off a promotion place. The following week, Brahimi continued to display his offensive prowess scoring against Le Havre. However, the match ended in a 2–1 defeat for Clermont. It was the club's first defeat in a match where Brahimi had scored a goal. Three days later, Brahimi scored his eight goal of the campaign in a 3–1 victory against Guingamp. The victory established a promotion playoff match on the final match day of the season as fourth-placed Clermont faced third-placed Arles-Avignon with the victory earning promotion to Ligue 1. Unfortunately for Clermont, the club failed to earn promotion to Ligue 1 for the first time in club history as it lost the match 1–0. Brahimi played 89 minutes in the match receiving a yellow card in the process.

Return to Rennes

Following the season, on 15 May 2010, Rennes manager Frédéric Antonetti confirmed that Brahimi would return to the team, despite interest from Arsenal and Real Madrid, and that he would be heavily relied upon for the 2010–11 season possibly serving as the playmaker replacing the aging Jérôme Leroy. On 7 August 2010, Brahimi made his club debut for Rennes in the club's opening league match against Lille. He started the match and played 71 minutes in a 1–1 draw. The following day, Rennes announced that Brahimi had signed a four-year contract extension with the club. The new deal was to keep him at the club until June 2014.

On 14 August 2010, Brahimi scored his first career goal for the club in a 3–0 victory over Nancy. For a portion of the fall season, the play-maker underwent a dry spell not scoring a goal or providing an assist. As a result, Brahimi began rotating in and out of the starting lineup. After the winter break, Brahimi returned to form scoring and providing an assist in the team's 7–0 hammering of Championnat National club Cannes in the Coupe de France. One week later, he scored a double in a 4–0 league win over Arles-Avignon. On 5 February 2011, Brahimi scored a goal against his former youth club Paris Saint-Germain. The long-range driven goal was the only goal of the match as the victory moved Rennes equal on points with PSG for second place.

Granada
On 30 August 2012, Brahimi signed on loan for Granada CF of the Spanish La Liga for €700,000, with the option to sign for €4 million afterwards. This option was taken on 4 June 2013, when he signed a four-year deal at the club. At the LFP Awards, he was voted the best African player of the 2013–14 season.

Porto
On 22 July 2014, FC Porto announced the signing of Brahimi from Granada for a €6.5 million transfer fee and on a five-year contract. On 24 July 2014 Porto sold 80% of his economic rights to Doyen Sports for €5 million. The deals effectively made Porto acquired 20% economic rights of the player for €1.5 million.

Brahimi's first goal for the club came in the second leg of their UEFA Champions League play-off against Lille, scoring directly from a free-kick as Porto advanced to the group stage with a 3–0 aggregate victory. He scored his first hat-trick for the club in Porto's first match of the Champions League group stage, a 6–0 home win over BATE Borisov on 17 September. In their next European fixture, he had his penalty saved by goalkeeper Andriy Pyatov with the game goalless at Shakhtar Donetsk. He scored his first league goal against C.D. Nacional in a 2–0 win on 1 November. On 5 November, Brahimi scored one goal and assisted another as Porto defeated Athletic Bilbao 2–0 to secure qualification to the knockout stage of the Champions League.

On 26 June 2015, Porto bought back 30% economic rights from Doyen for €3.8 million.

Brahimi scored one goal as Porto defeated Maccabi Tel Aviv 2–0 in the group stage of the 2015–16 UEFA Champions League.

He left Porto upon the expiration of his contract on 30 June 2019.

Al-Rayyan
On 22 July 2019, Brahimi joined Qatar Stars League side Al-Rayyan. In his first season, he scored 15 goals and assisted 5 times in 22 appearances in league. The club finished second without to win any trophies, also the team was eliminated in the AFC Champions League playoff round. In his second season, after the team’s faltering start, Brahimi was linked with a move to QSL champions Al-Duhail in January 2021.

International career

France
As early as age 13, Brahimi began featuring with regional youth teams playing for Île-de-France alongside future youth international teammates Mamadou Sakho, Tripy Makonda, Maxime Partouche and Sébastien Corchia. Brahimi made his debut for the under-16 team on 21 March 2006 converting a penalty in a 3–1 victory over Germany. He played with the under-16 team at the 2006 edition of the Montaigu Tournament playing in all four matches the team contested as France were crowned champions defeating Italy 2–1 in the final. With the under-17 team, Brahimi made his debut on 25 September in a qualification match for the 2007 UEFA European Under-17 Championship against Lithuania. France won the match 4–2 with Brahimi making a substitute appearance. Despite appearing in the first round of qualification, Brahimi was absent from the tournament itself, due to the player struggling to adapt at his new club domestically. He later failed to make the team that qualified for the 2007 FIFA U-17 World Cup, which was achieved by virtue of their semi-final appearance in the UEFA-sanctioned tournament. Brahimi made his debut with the under-18 team on 18 December 2007 in a friendly match against Portugal in a 1–0 loss and later featured in two friendly matches against Germany, one of which was played at the GAZi-Stadion auf der Waldau in Stuttgart.

With the under-19 team, Brahimi appeared in all 19 matches scoring 12 goals. He was immense during the 2009 UEFA European Under-19 Championship qualification scoring a team-leading five goals against Liechtenstein, Malta and the Republic of Ireland, scoring two goals each against the Liechtenstein and the hosts. Brahimi also scored several goals in friendly matches. On 30 March 2009, he scored a goal against the Ukraine and, the following month, scored a brace against Finland in a 7–0 rout. At the 2009 UEFA European Under-19 Championship, Brahimi scored two goals, one against Serbia and another against Spain. The match-winning goal against Spain assured France's progression to the semi-finals, where they lost to England.

Brahimi is also eligible to represent Algeria at international level. Following a successful season with Clermont, he was contacted by the Algerian Football Federation, which offered the player an opportunity to play on the team at the 2010 FIFA World Cup. Brahimi was set to be named to manager Rabah Saadane's preliminary squad list for the competition, but turned down the opportunity with his preference being to continue his international career with France. On 12 May 2010, after almost a year not representing France internationally, Brahimi was called up to the under-20 team by coach Patrick Gonfalone to participate in the 2010 Toulon Tournament. In the team's second group stage match against Japan, Brahimi scored the final goal in the team's 4–1 victory. He played in all five of the team's matches as France finished in third place.

On 26 August 2010, Brahimi was called up to the under-21 team by coach Erick Mombaerts for the first time for 2011 UEFA European Under-21 Championship qualification matches against the Ukraine and Malta. He made his under-21 debut in the match against Malta. Brahimi played the entire match in a 2–0 victory. He subsequently featured in the team's three matches before dropping out of the selection for the team's friendly match against Slovakia in February 2011 due to injury.

Algeria

In February 2013, it was announced Brahimi had decided to switch his FIFA national allegiance to represent Algeria. He made his debut a month later as a starter in the 3–1 win over Benin in the 2014 FIFA World Cup qualifiers.

On 22 June 2014, Brahimi scored his first international goal, the fourth for Algeria as they won 4–2 against South Korea in the group stage of the 2014 World Cup. He started all of Algeria's group matches, and was a substitute in the round of 16 as they lost in extra time to eventual champions Germany.

Brahimi was also in Algeria's squad for the 2015 Africa Cup of Nations. In their first group match, against South Africa, his cross was headed-in for an equaliser as an own goal for Thulani Hlatshwayo as Algeria came from behind to win 3–1. In their next match, he was chosen as Man of the Match, although the team lost 1–0 to Ghana. Brahimi featured in their next two matches as well, ending with defeat in the quarter-finals against eventual champions Ivory Coast.

Style of play
Described as "technically gifted player", Brahimi is known for his great dribbling abilities and ability to take on players. Described by many coaches and journalists as a "Versatile winger that is unpredictable," Brahimi has earned himself the name as a great dribbler and a winger with pace and skill, earning himself the 2014 BBC African player of the year.

Personal life
Brahimi is a practicing Muslim.

Career statistics

Club

International

Scores and results list Algeria's goal tally first, score column indicates score after each Brahimi goal.

Honours
Porto
Primeira Liga: 2017–18
Supertaça Cândido de Oliveira: 2018

Algeria
Africa Cup of Nations: 2019
FIFA Arab Cup: 2021

Individual
LFP Awards Best African Player: 2013–14
El Heddaf Arab Footballer of the Year: 2014
BBC African Footballer of the Year: 2014
CAF Most Promising Talent of the Year: 2014
 CAF Team of the Year: 2014, 2015
DZFoot d'Or: 2014
Algerian Ballon d'or: 2014
Algerian Olympic and Sports Awards: Best Algerian athletes of the year 2014
Primeira Liga Goal of the Month: October/November 2015 (vs. C.D. Tondela), October 2016 (vs. F.C. Arouca), January 2018 (vs. Vitória de Guimarães) 
 Porto Player of the Year: 2017
O Jogo Player of the Year: 2017
O Jogo Team of the Year: 2017
FPF "Quinas de Ouro" Primeira Liga Team of the Year: 2017
SJPF Primeira Liga Team of the Year: 2017
2019 Taça da Liga Final: Man of the Match
Qatar Stars League Team of the Year: 2019–20
Qatar Stars League Joint Top Scorer: 2019–20
FIFA Arab Cup Golden Ball: 2021
FIFA Arab Cup Silver Boot: 2021

References

External links

 
 
 

1990 births
Living people
French sportspeople of Algerian descent
French Muslims
Algerian Muslims
Footballers from Seine-Saint-Denis
French footballers
Algerian footballers
Association football midfielders
INF Clairefontaine players
Paris Saint-Germain F.C. players
Stade Rennais F.C. players
Clermont Foot players
Granada CF footballers
FC Porto players
Al-Rayyan SC players
Al-Gharafa SC players
Ligue 1 players
Ligue 2 players
La Liga players
Primeira Liga players
Qatar Stars League players
France youth international footballers
France under-21 international footballers
Algeria international footballers
2014 FIFA World Cup players
2015 Africa Cup of Nations players
2017 Africa Cup of Nations players
2019 Africa Cup of Nations players
Africa Cup of Nations-winning players
French expatriate footballers
Algerian expatriate footballers
French expatriate sportspeople in Spain
Algerian expatriate sportspeople in Spain
French expatriate sportspeople in Portugal
Algerian expatriate sportspeople in Portugal
French expatriate sportspeople in Qatar
Algerian expatriate sportspeople in Qatar
Expatriate footballers in Spain
Expatriate footballers in Portugal
Expatriate footballers in Qatar
2021 Africa Cup of Nations players
Sportspeople from Montreuil, Seine-Saint-Denis